Rima is a predominantly feminine given name that may refer to the following notable people: 

Rima al-Qadiri (born 1963), Syrian Arab politician
 Rima Assaf (born 1970), Lebanese journalist and anchor
 Rima Baškienė (born 1960), Lithuanian politician
 Rima Batalova, Paralympian track and field athlete from Russia
Rima Berns-McGown, South African born Canadian politician
Rima Bishwokarma, Nepalese film actress, model and television journalist
Rima Das (born 1982), Indian filmmaker
 Rima Fakih (born 1985), Miss USA 2010
Rima Horton (born 1947), English former Labour Party councillor 
 Rima Kallingal, Malayalam actor
 Rima Karaki, Lebanese news anchor
Rima Kashafutdinova (born 1995), Kazakhstani sprinter
Rima Khachatryan (1938–2020), Armenian educator and chemist
 Rima Khalaf (born 1953), Jordanian former government minister and United Nations official
Rima Khelil (born 1989), Algerian team handball player
Rima Maktabi (born 1977), Lebanese TV presenter and journalist
Rima Melati (born 1939), Indonesian actress and singer
Rima Melati Adams (born 1980), Singaporean model, actress, singer and TV personality
Rima Pipoyan (born 1988), Armenian choreographer, director, dancer and dance teacher
Rima Ramanuj, Indian television actress,
Rima Raminfar (born 1970), Iranian actor and screenwriter
Rima Sultana Rimu (born  2002), Bangladeshi women's rights activist
Rima Salah (born 1943), Jordanian United Nations official
Rima Taha (born 1987), Jordanian sprinter
Rima Te Wiata (born 1963), British-born New Zealand singer, comedian and stage, film and television actress
 Rima Valentienė (born 1978), Lithuanian professional basketball player
Rima Wakarua (born 1976), Italian rugby union footballer and coach
Rima Zeidan (born 1990), Taiwanese-Lebanese presenter, model and actress

See also
Rimma